is a platform game released by Namco in arcades in 1990. It runs on the Namco System 2 hardware. The game was published for the Mega Drive in 1991, with the European version renamed Talmit's Adventure. The game shares its name with the fictitious kingdom where the 1986 Japan-only Famicom game Valkyrie no Bōken: Toki no Kagi Densetsu takes place, but has no connections with it otherwise. Likewise the game has no connections with Marvel Comics or any of their associated characters either. In December 2022, the arcade version of Marvel Land was re-released exclusively in Japan on the Nintendo Switch and the PlayStation 4 on the Arcade Archives lineup of digital arcade titles. It was originally planned for worldwide release at one point but was ultimately cancelled due to licensing issues with Disney (who then copyrighted the Marvel brand in 2009) and Hamster Corporation.

Gameplay

In Marvel Land, the player must take control of Prince Paco (Talmit in English), who is on a quest to save Princess Luxie (Wondra in English) from the evil Mole King (Japanese: 魔王モウル; Maō Mōru); the gameplay is similar to that for Nintendo's Super Mario Bros.. Power-ups make it easier for Paco to defeat enemies and collect various items to increase his score; these include dragon wings which allow Paco to jump higher and fly (to a certain extent), shoes that can allow him to walk faster for a while, and a clone powerup which allows him to whip multiple copies of himself at enemies in a line. Each of the game's four worlds take place in an amusement park (which is the eponymous "Marvel Land"), and most areas are set outside with various obstacles that must be overcome; other areas include a ride on a roller coaster, and even a walk through a funhouse. At the end of the regular outside levels, Paco must jump through a huge target to earn between 100 and 7650 (Namco's goroawase number) extra points; the remaining time will also then be added to the score.

The game's enemies are an army of moles known as "Mogles", along with a wide range of other creatures. A boss must also be fought at the end of the last area of all four worlds; they are unique in that they are played more like a minigame (rock paper scissors for Worlds 1 and 4, and tug of war for Worlds 2 and 3). After Paco defeats a boss, he rescues a fairy (Luxie after he defeats the Mole King) and is treated to a bonus stage, where he must catch falling stars for points in a float parade at night.

Some rides featured in the various levels, along with the bonus stage parade floats, contain several of Namco's earlier characters, such as Pac-Man (1980), Pooka from Dig Dug (1982), Solvalou from Xevious (1982), Mappy (1983), Grobda (1984), Gilgamesh and Ki from Tower of Druaga (1984), Paccet from Baraduke (1985), Valkyrie of Valkyrie no Bōken (NES, 1986), Wonder Momo (1987), Amul (in "one-headed" form) from Dragon Spirit (1987) and Beraboh Man (1988). The pink-and-silver female robot who appears at the start of each world, also appears in the Namco System 12-era World Stadium games as the Nikotama Gals' catcher and in the Namco Museum series at the information desk.

Reception 
In Japan, Game Machine listed Marvel Land on their March 15, 1990 issue as being the eighth most-successful table arcade game of the year.

Legacy
Marvel Land reappears as the setting of one of the chapters of the 2015 Nintendo 3DS game, Project X Zone 2. The game's party ends up visiting the park due to the park's name being confused with Marvel Land from Valkyrie no Bōken: Toki no Kagi Densetsu. The game also showed up as an occasional Video Challenge on the early-1990s Nickelodeon game show Nick Arcade.

References

External links

1990 video games
Arcade video games
Namco arcade games
Tose (company) games
Video games developed in Japan
Virtual Console games
Video games scored by Yoshiki Nishimura
Video games set in amusement parks